Achthophora ferruginea is a species of beetle in the family Cerambycidae found in Asia. It is endemic to the Islands of the Philippines.

References

Lamiini
Beetles described in 1924